Agnes De Nul (March 17, 1955) is a Belgian actress. She is especially known for her role as Kabouter Kwebbel in the television series Kabouter Plop. She also played the drama teacher in Ghost Rockers.

References

External links
 

1955 births
Living people
Belgian actresses
Articles needing translation from Dutch Wikipedia